Bruce Herbert Glover (born May 2, 1932) is an American character actor best known for his portrayal of the assassin Mr. Wint in the James Bond film Diamonds Are Forever. He is the father of actor Crispin Glover.

Life and career
Glover was born in Chicago, Illinois, to Eva Elvira (née Hedstrom) and Herbert Homan Glover. He is of English, Czech, and Swedish descent.

Glover was drafted into the U.S. Army serving from 1953 to 1955 where he served six months in Korea.

He began acting with numerous appearances on various television shows including My Favorite Martian (1963), Perry Mason: The Case of the Golden Girls (1965), The Rat Patrol (1966), Hawk (1966), The Mod Squad (1968), Gunsmoke (1969), Adam 12 (1969), Mission: Impossible (1970), Bearcats! (1971), Police Story (1977), The Feather and Father Gang (1977), CHiPs (1978), and The Dukes of Hazzard (1979). In 1978, he appeared on the Barney Miller episode: "The Prisoner".

In 1971, Glover and jazz musician Putter Smith portrayed the assassins Mr. Wint and Mr. Kidd, respectively, in the James Bond film Diamonds Are Forever.

Glover played a motorcycle gang leader known as Bach in the Adam-12 episode Log 103: A Sound Like Thunder (1969). He also played a redneck thug harassing well-meaning teenagers in the drama Bless the Beasts and Children (1971), was leaning on hustler James Coburn to repay his debts in Hard Times (1975), and contributed another icy performance as Duffy in Chinatown (1974). In addition, he appeared as Captain Voda, a Soviet military officer, in "Doomsday, and Counting", an episode of The Six Million Dollar Man.

Glover also appeared as deputy Grady Coker in the film Walking Tall (1973) and the sequels: Walking Tall Part 2 (1975) and Walking Tall: Final Chapter (1977). He remained busy through the 1980s and 1990s with more guest spots on TV shows including Hart to Hart (1981), T.J. Hooker (1982), The A-Team (1983), and Murder, She Wrote (1989).  He also appeared in the films Ghost Town (1988), Popcorn (1991), and Warlock: The Armageddon (1993).

In the 1950s, Glover began to teach acting. In the 1970s, he conducted acting classes with "The Indian Actors Workshops" and had various acting studios around Los Angeles, California. In the 1990s, Glover added an additional level to his West Los Angeles residence to accommodate an acting studio.

More recently, Glover was interviewed by Chris Aable on the cable television show Hollywood Today (1995), and appeared in the films Night of the Scarecrow (1995), Die Hard Dracula (1998), and Ghost World (2001).

Selected filmography

Never Steal Anything Small (1959) – Stevedore (uncredited)
Who Killed Teddy Bear (1965) – Frank
Frankenstein Meets the Space Monster (1965) – Martian Crewmember / The Space Monster (uncredited)
Blindfold (1965) – Sailor in Cab (uncredited)
Sweet Love, Bitter (1967)
The Thomas Crown Affair (1968) – Bank Manager (uncredited)
Dayton's Devils (1968) 
C.C. and Company (1970) – Captain Midnight
Bless the Beasts and Children (1971) – Hustler
Scandalous John (1971) – Sludge
Diamonds Are Forever (1971) – Mr. Wint
Black Gunn (1972) – Ray Kriley
Walking Tall (1973) – Grady Coker
One Little Indian (1973) – Schrader
Chinatown (1974) – Duffy
Hard Times (1975) – Doty
Walking Tall Part 2 (1975) – Grady Coker
Stunts (1977) – Chuck Johnson
Walking Tall: Final Chapter (1977) – Deputy Grady
Sultan and the Rock Star (1980) - Alec Frost
Hart to Hart (1981) - Wilkes
The Big Score (1983) – Koslo
Hunter's Blood (1986) – One Eye
Big Bad Mama II (1987) – Morgan Crawford
Ghost Town (1988) – Dealer
Hider in the House (1989) – Gene Hufford
Penny Ante: The Motion Picture (1990) – Roy
Popcorn (1991) – Vernon
Chaindance (1991) – Casey
Shakespeare's Plan 12 from Outer Space (1991)
Street Wars (1992) – Chief Reed (uncredited)
Warlock: The Armageddon (1993) – Ted Ellison
Night of the Scarecrow (1995) – Thaddeus
American Hero (1997) – General Clover
Die Hard Dracula (1998) – Doctor Van Helsing
Spoiler (1998) – Priest
Suicide, the Comedy (1998) – Lap Dance Bob (uncredited)
Ghost World (2001) – Feldman the Wheel Chair Guy
Will Unplugged (2005) – Warren
Simon Says (2006) – Sam
It Is Fine! Everything Is Fine. (2007) – The Ex-Husband
Broke Sky (2007) – Rufus
Buffalo Bushido (2009) – Soup / Javier
Six Days in Paradise (2010) – Frank Burns
Scammerhead (2014) – Wyndham Bawtree
Hiszpanka (2015) – Kubryk

References

External links
 
 Yahoo! Movies

1932 births
Living people
Male actors from Chicago
American male film actors
American male television actors
American people of English descent
American people of Czech descent
American people of Swedish descent
20th-century American male actors
21st-century American male actors
Acting teachers
American military personnel of the Korean War